Kidderminster Rural District was a Rural District in Worcestershire, England until 1974 when it was abolished under the Local Government Act 1972, becoming part of the new Wyre Forest District, together with the boroughs of Kidderminster and Bewdley and Stourport-on-Severn urban district.

External links
http://www.visionofbritain.org.uk/unit_page.jsp?u_id=10136258

History of Worcestershire
Local government in Worcestershire
Districts of England created by the Local Government Act 1894
Districts of England abolished by the Local Government Act 1972
Rural districts of England